Sacharki  is a village in the administrative district of Gmina Michałowo, within Białystok County, Podlaskie Voivodeship, in north-eastern Poland, close to the border with Belarus. It is around 40 km south-east of the city of Białystok.

References

Sacharki